The United Collegiate Hockey Conference (UCHC) is a college athletic conference which operates in Maryland, New York, and Pennsylvania in the eastern United States.  It participates in NCAA Division III as a hockey-only conference.

The conference was announced in 2016 as an association of 10 schools and league play began for the 2017–18 academic year, with nine each playing in the men's and women's divisions.  The majority of the member schools were previously members of the now-defunct ECAC West hockey conference. Wilkes University was also announced as a future member for both the men's and women's divisions for the start of the 2018–19 academic year, the same time when charter men's member Nazareth College began varsity women's play in the UCHC. The following season, Alvernia University joined for its first season of varsity women's play. A more recent change to conference membership came in July 2021 with the launch of new varsity men's and women's programs by Arcadia University. The most recent change came in 2022–23 when Alvernia added a newly launched men's team to its existing UCHC membership.

Currently, William Smith College is the only UCHC member that competes solely in the women's division.

The league did not have an automatic bid to the NCAA Division III Men's Ice Hockey Championship or the NCAA Division III Women's Ice Hockey Championship for the 2017–18 season but the Men's league gained the bid for the 2018–19 season and the Women's league did for the 2019-20 season.

Member schools

Current members

Membership timeline

Former members

Champions

Men

Women

Arenas

References

External links
Official web site

 
2016 establishments in the United States
NCAA Division III ice hockey conferences
Sports organizations established in 2016
Sports leagues established in 2016